DTU Diplom, formerly known as Copenhagen University College of Engineering (Danish: Ingeniørhøjskolen i København), is the largest of its kind in Denmark. Since it was founded in 1881, the university college greatly expanded its programmes and facilities. It is situated in attractive surroundings in Ballerup 15 km from the centre of Copenhagen and commands 42.000 m2 of functional and beautiful buildings designed by PLH Architects.

The Copenhagen University College of Engineering offers: Bachelor's degrees in Mechanical Engineering, Production engineering, Computer Engineering, Electrical Engineering, IT Engineering and finally Export Engineering. Some of the programmes are taught completely in English. The programmes are fixed at 3½ years, including a six-month traineeship in a Danish or foreign company, except the programme in export engineering which takes 4½ years, also including a six-month traineeship in a Danish or foreign company.  
The university college offers bachelor-level post-graduate courses through the Department of Higher Education. Finally, the university college has an admission course for those who wish to attend engineering studies. The course is an introduction to engineering aimed at those with vocational education.

Merge with Technical University of Denmark
As per January 1, 2013, the Engineering College of Copenhagen merged with the Technical University of Denmark (DTU). After the merge, the facilities are now called DTU Diplom.

References

External links
Official website
Copenhagen University College of Engineering
Copenhagen University College of Engineering - pages in English

Educational institutions established in 1881
Universities in Denmark
1881 establishments in Denmark